The 1979 Uganda National League was the 12th season of the Ugandan football championship, the top-level football league of Uganda.

Overview
The 1979 Uganda National League was contested by 14 teams and was won by Uganda Commercial Bank FC, while Kilembe Mines FC, Lint Marketing Board and UT Mills were relegated.

League standings

Leading goalscorer
The top goalscorer in the 1979 season was Davis Kamoga of Kampala City Council FC with 18 goals.

References

External links
 Uganda - List of Champions - RSSSF (Hans Schöggl)
 Ugandan Football League Tables - League321.com

Ugandan Super League seasons
Uganda
Uganda
1